Applied Linguistics is a peer-reviewed academic journal in the field of applied linguistics established in 1980 and published by Oxford University Press. It appears six times a year. Current editor-in-chief is Christina Higgins (University of Hawaiʻi at Mānoa).

According to the Journal Citation Reports, the journal had a 2020 impact factor of 5.741.

Aims and scope
The journal publishes both research papers and conceptual articles in all aspects of applied linguistics, such as lexicography, corpus linguistics, multilingualism, discourse analysis, and language education, aiming at promoting discussion among researchers in different fields. It features a "Forum" section, introduced in 2001, intended for short contributions, such as responses to articles and notices about current research.

Abstracting and indexing
The journal is abstracted and indexed by:

See also
List of applied linguistics journals

References

External links 
 

English-language journals
Linguistics journals
Oxford University Press academic journals
Quarterly journals
Publications established in 1980